The 1910 Tennessee Volunteers football team represented the University of Tennessee in the 1910 college football season.  Lex Stone was the team's head coach.

Schedule

References

Tennessee
Tennessee Volunteers football seasons
Tennessee Volunteers football